

Moody is a locality in the Australian state of  South Australia located on the Eyre Peninsula about  west of the state capital of Adelaide.  Its name and boundaries were both adopted and created in 1978.  Its name is derived from the Hundred of Moody, the cadastral unit in which it is located.  Moody is located within the federal division of Grey, the state electoral district of Flinders and the local government area of the District Council of Tumby Bay.

See also

List of cities and towns in South Australia

References

Towns in South Australia
Eyre Peninsula